USS Casco is a name used more than once by the United States Navy:

 , a monitor in commission from 1864 to 1865
 , a cargo ship in commission from 1918 to 1919
 , a seaplane tender in commission from 1941 to 1947

See also
  (later (WHEC-370)

United States Navy ship names